Alexey Makovetskiy (born 27 March 1983) is a Russian rugby union footballer. He plays as a fly-half.

He had 45 caps for Russia, from 2010 to 2015, scoring 5 tries, 25 points on aggregate. Makovetskiy was part of the Russian squad at the 2011 Rugby World Cup, playing in three games and scoring a try.

References

External links

1983 births
Living people
Russia international rugby union players
Russian rugby union players
Rugby union fly-halves